Paul Andrew Williams (born 1973 in Portsmouth, England) is a British film writer and director. He won the New Director's Award for his film London to Brighton in the 2006 Edinburgh International Film Festival.

Career
Williams began his career as an actor but later wrote and directed pop-promos, viral ads and short films. In 2001 he wrote and directed the short film Royalty which inspired London to Brighton. Royalty premiered at the London Film Festival in 2001, was shown UK television, was shortlisted for the Kodak showcase, and later screened at BAFTA.  In 2003 Williams was the only UK-based director to be picked up by the Fox Searchlight Director's Lab. His short film, It's Okay to Drink Whiskey, made through this programme, premiered at 2004's Sundance Film Festival. His UK TV debut, Naked, was pick of the day in Time Out magazine.

Through a new development slate between Pathe and BBC Films, Williams was hired to write The Choir. Williams wrote and directed the psychological thriller Cherry Tree Lane, which premiered as part of the Fright Fest.

Filmography

Writer
Bull (2021)
Miss You Already (2014)
Song for Marion (2012)
Cherry Tree Lane (2010)
The Children (2008)
The Cottage (2008)
London to Brighton (2006)
It's Okay to Drink Whiskey (2002)
Royalty (2001)

Director
Bull (2021)
Murdered for Being Different (2017)
Broadchurch (2017)
The Eichmann Show (2015)
Murdered by My Boyfriend (2014)
Song for Marion (2012)
Cherry Tree Lane (2010)
The Cottage (2008)
London to Brighton (2006)
Coming Up – Naked (2003)
It's Okay to Drink Whiskey (2002)
Royalty (2001)

Actor
London to Brighton (2006)

Producer
London to Brighton (2006)

References

1973 births
Living people
English film directors
English screenwriters
English male screenwriters
Mass media people from Portsmouth